The Brian Kozak Award is presented annually to the Manitoba Junior Hockey League's defenceman who demonstrates throughout the season the greatest all-round ability in the position during the regular season. The award was first presented in 1977.

MJHL Top Defencemen

References

External links
Manitoba Junior Hockey League
Manitoba Hockey Hall of Fame
Hockey Hall of Fame
Winnipeg Free Press Archives
Brandon Sun Archives

Manitoba Junior Hockey League trophies and awards